The 1974 Trofeo Vat 69 was a men's tennis tournament played on outdoor clay courts in Florence, Italy that was part of the Group C tier of the 1974 Commercial Union Assurance Grand Prix circuit. It was the second edition of the tournament and was played from 6 May until 12 May 1974. Adriano Panatta won the singles title.

Finals

Singles
 Adriano Panatta defeated  Paolo Bertolucci 6–3, 6–1
 It was Panatta's 1st singles title of the year and the 3rd of his career.

Doubles
 Paolo Bertolucci /  Adriano Panatta defeated  Róbert Machán /  Balázs Taróczy 6–3, 3–6, 6–4

References

External links
 ITF tournament edition details

Trofeo Vat 69
Trofeo Vat 69